John Chambers Eldridge (1872 – 17 April 1954), Australian politician. He was a member of the Australian House of Representatives from 1929 to 1931, representing the electorate of Martin for the Australian Labor Party (1929–1931) and the splinter Lang Labor party (1931).

Eldridge was born in Kolkata, India. He educated at the Cootamundra, Marrickville and Fort Street schools in New South Wales and studied economics at the University of Sydney and social sciences and administration at the University of London. He became a public servant, and was assistant superintendent of the State Labour Bureau for many years; he also served as secretary of the British Empire League in Australia. Eldridge enlisted for service in World War I as a gunner in 1916, but was not deployed overseas until June 1918. Among his later public service roles was Executive Secretary of the New South Wales Commission for the British Empire Exhibition and Secretary of the New South Wales Commission for the New Zealand Exhibition; during the mid-1920s, he was an officer with the state Department of Labour and Industry. He founded the Social Science Service of Australia, was president of the New South Wales Pedestrians Association and patron of the League of New South Wales Wheelmen, and was a member of the Returned Soldiers' Association. An active member of the Labor Party, Eldridge wrote articles for Labor journals across a range of subjects, was an unsuccessful candidate for the Senate at the 1925 federal election and directed the party's radio campaign at the 1929 election.

He was elected to the House of Representatives at the 1929 federal election, when he unexpectedly won the seat of Martin amidst Labor's large victory that year. Eldridge was a prominent supporter of Premier of New South Wales Jack Lang and his "Lang Plan" for responding to the Great Depression, and was heavily involved in the bitter divisions leading to the Lang section of the 1931 Labor split. As the split progressed, he was seen as the Lang Labor federal deputy leader under Jack Beasley. Given that Martin was thought to be unwinnable for a second term, Eldridge sought to contest Barton, held by official Labor incumbent James Tully at the forthcoming federal election. On 25 November 1931, Eldridge moved for the vote that, when Eldridge and his Lang colleagues voted with the opposition, brought down the Scullin Labor government. Both Eldridge and Tully lost to a United Australia Party candidate at the resulting 1931 election.

He was a Commonwealth Arbitration Inspector from August 1940. Eldridge also made a series of unsuccessful attempts to re-enter politics over many years: he contested the state seat of Croydon at the 1932 state election for Lang's State Labor Party, recontested Barton for Lang Labor in 1934, and following Lang Labor's collapse unsuccessfully sought Labor preselection in his old seat of Martin in 1942 and for the Senate in 1945.

He died in 1954 at his daughter's residence in Rockdale, aged 82.

References

Members of the Australian House of Representatives for Martin
Members of the Australian House of Representatives
Australian Labor Party members of the Parliament of Australia
Lang Labor members of the Parliament of Australia
1872 births
1954 deaths
20th-century Australian politicians